Crematogaster chlorotica is a species of ant in tribe Crematogastrini. It was described by Emery in 1899.

References

chlorotica
Insects described in 1899